Below is a list of ports in the Great Lakes region, which includes Lake Erie, Lake Huron, Lake Michigan, Lake Ontario, and Lake Superior, as well as the smaller Lake St. Clair.

Lake Superior

Michigan 
 Houghton
 Marquette
 Munising
 Sault Ste. Marie

Ontario 
 Sault Ste. Marie
 Thunder Bay
 Wawa
 Heron Bay
 Marathon

Minnesota 
 Duluth
Two Harbors
Silver Bay
Taconite Harbor

Wisconsin 
 Superior
 Ashland
 Bayfield
 La Pointe

Lake Michigan

Michigan 
 Benton Harbor
 Brevort
 Escanaba
 Frankfort
 Grand Haven
 Holland
 Ludington
 Manistee
 Manistique
 Menominee
 Muskegon
 Naubinway
 New Buffalo
 Pentwater
 Petoskey
 St. Joseph
 South Haven
 Traverse City
 Port Inland
 Charlevoix
 Port Sheldon

Indiana 
 Michiana Shores
 Michigan City
 Hammond
 Gary
 East Chicago

Illinois 
 Calumet City
 Chicago
Waukegan

Wisconsin 
 Milwaukee
 Kenosha
Racine
Manitowoc
Sturgeon Bay
Green Bay
Howard
Oconto
Marinette
Sheboygan
Port Washington
Two Rivers
Kewaunee

Lake Huron

Michigan 
 St. Ignace
Cheboygan
Rogers City
Alpena
Harrisville
East Tawas
Tawas City
Standish
Bay City
Port Austin
Sandusky
Port Huron
De tour Village
Drummond Township

Ontario 
 Sarnia
 Goderich 
 Owen Sound
 Thessalon
 The North Shore
 McGregor Bay
 Midland
 Collingwood
 Penetanguishene
 Wiarton
 Tobermory
 Tehkummah
 Little Current
 Parry Sound

Lake Saint Clair

Michigan 
 Algonac
 Mount Clemens
 Detroit
 St Clair
 Marine City

Ontario 
 Windsor
 Tecumseh

Lake Erie

Michigan 
 Monroe
 Luna Pier

Ohio 
 Ashtabula
 Cleveland
 Conneaut
 Fairport
 Lorain
 Sandusky
 Toledo
Huron
Put in Bay
Lakeside Marblehead
Port Clinton
Rocky River

Pennsylvania 
 Erie

New York 
 Buffalo
 Niagara Falls
Dunkirk

Ontario 
 Kingsville
 Leamington
 Nanticoke
 Niagara Falls
 Port Stanley
 Port Matiland
 Port Burwell
 Port Dover
Amherstburg
LaSalle

Lake Ontario

New York 
 Rochester
 Alexandria Bay
 Oswego
 Clayton

Ontario 
 Toronto
 Hamilton
 Saint Catharines
 Picton
Port Weller
 Oshawa 
 Kingston
 Oakville
 Bronte
 Mississauga
 Port Hope
 Cobourg
 Cramahe
 Belleville
 Bath

Great Lakes
Ports
Great Lakes